Inguna Sudraba (born 21 November 1964) is a Latvian politician.

Inguna Sudraba graduated from the University of Latvia in 1988 with a degree in economic planning. From July 1994 through June 2003 she was deputy finance minister for Latvia. From December 2004 through January 2013 Inguna Sudraba was auditor general in the State Auditing Office of Latvia. In May 2014 she became leader of the new political party For Latvia from the Heart.

References

External links 
 

1964 births
Living people
People from Gulbene
For Latvia from the Heart politicians
Deputies of the 12th Saeima
Women deputies of the Saeima
Women government ministers of Latvia

21st-century Latvian women politicians